The Navy Medal is the highest peacetime military award issued by Spain's navy.
The regulation for the issue of this medal is modified by the Royal Decree 1040/2003, 1 August (BOD. Núm. 177).

Appearance
On the obverse, surrounded by a silver edge, is a rising sun behind the sea and a matron stands, representing Spain, offering, with the right hand, a laurel wreath and holding a sword with the left. At the top of the oval are the words: "Al mérito distinguido". On the reverse is the emblem of the Navy. Each medal has a clasp attached to the ribbon with the legend of the action done in black.

References

Military awards and decorations of Spain

es:Medalla del Ejército, Naval y Aérea